Ruan Yi (born 17 July 1981) is a Chinese former swimmer who competed in the 2000 Summer Olympics.

References

1981 births
Living people
Chinese female butterfly swimmers
Swimmers from Zhejiang
Olympic swimmers of China
Swimmers at the 2000 Summer Olympics
Asian Games medalists in swimming
World Aquatics Championships medalists in swimming
Asian Games silver medalists for China
Medalists at the 1998 Asian Games
Swimmers at the 1998 Asian Games
21st-century Chinese women